Shiraia is a monotypic moth genus of the family Noctuidae erected by Shigero Sugi in 1982. Its only species, Shiraia tripartita, was first described by John Henry Leech in 1900. It is found in western China.

References

Acontiinae
Monotypic moth genera